A Million Lights is the lead single, released on August 11, 2017, from Michael W. Smith's album of the same name.

Background
Smith told NewReleaseToday the story of the track:
"I wrote the melody for this song, and it was the first song I started writing for this album. It was one of those songs I found that I forgot that I had written. It felt contagious. We sped it up 10 beats per minute, and at first I didn't like that, but as I thought about it I got used to it. 
We talked about what the song made me think of, and I said that it made me think about space. As a kid, I wanted to be an astronaut. I'm still fascinated by space. I take out my binoculars and look at the stars and the craters on the moon. I have a God experience just looking at the sky. It's been that way my whole life. We partnered that thought with 'all the stars are singing' and how God talks about creating the universe and all of space."

Composition
A Million Lights is originally in the key of G Major, with a tempo of 110 beats per minute.

Music video
The music video for the song premiered on VEVO October 24, 2017. It shows Smith inside a spacecraft getting ready for a walk on the outer part of the galaxy and staring at the stars in the sky in his spacesuit. The video has almost one million views on YouTube.

Live performances
Smith performed the song on television for the first time on Good Morning America.

Charts

Release history

References 

2017 singles
2017 songs
Michael W. Smith songs
Gospel songs
American pop songs
Contemporary Christian songs
Songs written by Paul Moak